Weekly Rest (Industry) Convention, 1921 is  an International Labour Organization Convention on limitation of working time to eight-hour day and 48 hours for a week.

It was established in 1921:
Having decided upon the adoption of certain proposals with regard to the weekly rest day in industrial employment,...

Ratifications
As of April 2021, the convention has been ratified by 120 states.

See also 
Weekly Rest (Commerce and Offices) Convention, 1957

External links 
Text.
Ratifications.

Weekly
Working time
Treaties concluded in 1921
Treaties entered into force in 1923
Treaties of the Kingdom of Afghanistan
Treaties of Algeria
Treaties of the People's Republic of Angola
Treaties of Antigua and Barbuda
Treaties of Argentina
Treaties of Armenia
Treaties of Azerbaijan
Treaties of the Bahamas
Treaties of Bahrain
Treaties of Bangladesh
Treaties of the Byelorussian Soviet Socialist Republic
Treaties of Belgium
Treaties of Belize
Treaties of the Republic of Dahomey
Treaties of Bolivia
Treaties of Bosnia and Herzegovina
Treaties of Botswana
Treaties of the Second Brazilian Republic
Treaties of the Kingdom of Bulgaria
Treaties of Burkina Faso
Treaties of Myanmar
Treaties of Burundi
Treaties of Cameroon
Treaties of Canada
Treaties of the Central African Republic
Treaties of Chad
Treaties of Chile
Treaties of the Republic of China (1912–1949)
Treaties of Colombia
Treaties of the Comoros
Treaties of the Republic of the Congo (Léopoldville)
Treaties of the Republic of the Congo
Treaties of the Cook Islands
Treaties of Costa Rica
Treaties of Ivory Coast
Treaties of Croatia
Treaties of Cuba
Treaties of the Czech Republic
Treaties of Czechoslovakia
Treaties of Denmark
Treaties of Djibouti
Treaties of Dominica
Treaties of the United Arab Republic
Treaties of Equatorial Guinea
Treaties of Estonia
Treaties of the People's Democratic Republic of Ethiopia
Treaties of Finland
Treaties of the French Third Republic
Treaties of Gabon
Treaties of Ghana
Treaties of the Kingdom of Greece
Treaties of Grenada
Treaties of Guatemala
Treaties of Guinea
Treaties of Guinea-Bissau
Treaties of Haiti
Treaties of Honduras
Treaties of the Hungarian People's Republic
Treaties of British India
Treaties of Pahlavi Iran
Treaties of the Iraqi Republic (1958–1968)
Treaties of the Irish Free State
Treaties of Israel
Treaties of the Kingdom of Italy (1861–1946)
Treaties of Kenya
Treaties of Kyrgyzstan
Treaties of Latvia
Treaties of Lebanon
Treaties of Lesotho
Treaties of the Libyan Arab Republic
Treaties of Lithuania
Treaties of Luxembourg
Treaties of North Macedonia
Treaties of Madagascar
Treaties of Mali
Treaties of Malta
Treaties of Mauritania
Treaties of Mauritius
Treaties of Mexico
Treaties of Montenegro
Treaties of Morocco
Treaties of the People's Republic of Mozambique
Treaties of Nepal
Treaties of the Netherlands
Treaties of New Zealand
Treaties of Nicaragua
Treaties of Niger
Treaties of Norway
Treaties of the Dominion of Pakistan
Treaties of Paraguay
Treaties of Peru
Treaties of the Second Polish Republic
Treaties of the Ditadura Nacional
Treaties of the Kingdom of Romania
Treaties of Rwanda
Treaties of Saint Lucia
Treaties of Saudi Arabia
Treaties of Senegal
Treaties of Serbia and Montenegro
Treaties of Slovakia
Treaties of Slovenia
Treaties of the Solomon Islands
Treaties of the Soviet Union
Treaties of Spain under the Restoration
Treaties of Suriname
Treaties of Eswatini
Treaties of Sweden
Treaties of Switzerland
Treaties of Tajikistan
Treaties of Thailand
Treaties of Togo
Treaties of Tunisia
Treaties of Turkey
Treaties of the Ukrainian Soviet Socialist Republic
Treaties of Uruguay
Treaties of Venezuela
Treaties of Vietnam
Treaties of the Yemen Arab Republic
Treaties of Yugoslavia
Treaties of Zimbabwe
Treaties of Malaysia
Treaties extended to the Netherlands Antilles
Treaties extended to Aruba
Treaties extended to the Belgian Congo
Treaties extended to Ruanda-Urundi
Treaties extended to the Faroe Islands
Treaties extended to Greenland
Treaties extended to French Somaliland
Treaties extended to French Polynesia
Treaties extended to New Caledonia
Treaties extended to Saint Pierre and Miquelon
Treaties extended to Wallis and Futuna
Treaties extended to the Cook Islands
Treaties extended to Niue
Treaties extended to Saint Christopher-Nevis-Anguilla
Treaties extended to the British Virgin Islands
Treaties extended to the Falkland Islands
Treaties extended to Montserrat
Treaties extended to Saint Helena, Ascension and Tristan da Cunha
1921 in labor relations